Blepephaeus higaononi is a species of beetle in the family Cerambycidae. It was described by Vives in 2009. It is known from the Philippines.

References

Blepephaeus
Beetles described in 2009